The Mentalist is an American crime procedural television series that ran from September 23, 2008, until February 18, 2015, on CBS. The series follows Simon Baker as Patrick Jane, an independent consultant for the California Bureau of Investigation (CBI) based in Sacramento, California and later on for the FBI. He has a remarkable track record for solving serious crimes by using his amazing skills of observation. Jane also makes frequent use of his mentalist abilities and his semi-celebrity past as a psychic medium using paranormal abilities he now admits he feigned. He abandoned his pretense out of remorse when his attention-seeking behavior attracted the attention of a serial killer, Red John, who killed his wife and daughter. With the exception of "Pilot", the first episode, and up through "Red John", the eighth episode of season six, the titles of all episodes refer or allude to "red" (or some shade thereof) as a word, color, or concept. Titles of episodes after this episode refer to different colors (e.g. white, silver, violet, blue, grey, black).

Series overview

Episodes 
With the exception of the pilot episode and season 2, episode 21, ("18-5-4" = "R-E-D")  each Mentalist episode title incorporated various colors.  Up to and including the sixth season's "Red John", the titles always included direct or indirect allusions to the color red, including various shades of red or items normally associated with red (e.g. blood, roses, fire).  These "red" references served as a reminder of Red John, the mysterious figure responsible for the murder of Patrick Jane's wife and daughter.  After the Red John storyline was resolved in "Red John," episode titles would allude to colors outside of red.

Season 1 (2008–09)

Season 2 (2009–10)

Season 3 (2010–11)

Season 4 (2011–12)

Season 5 (2012–13)

Season 6 (2013–14)

Season 7 (2014–15)

Home video releases

References

External links 
 
 
 

Mentalist
The Mentalist seasons